The Roman Catholic Diocese of Sindhudurg (Dioecesis Sindhudurgiensis) in India was created on July 5, 2005, when it was split from the Roman Catholic Diocese of Poona. It was a suffragan diocese of the Archdiocese of Bombay until 25 November 2006, when Pope Benedict XVI transferred it to the newly established Metropolitan province of Goa and Damão. The parish church in Sawantwadi, dedicated to Our Lady of Miracles, serves as the cathedral for the diocese.

The diocese covers an area of 21,099 km² of the state Maharashtra, covering the districts Sindhudurg, Ratnagiri and Kolhapur except the St. Francis Xavier parish in Kolhapur City. Neighboring dioceses are the Archdiocese of Goa and Daman to the south, the Diocese of Belgaum to the southeast, to the east the Diocese of Poona, to the north the Archdiocese of Bombay, and to the west is the Arabian Sea.

The total population in the diocese is 5,365,706, of which 29,794 are Catholic. The diocese is divided into 19 parishes.

Bishop Anthony Alwyn Fernandes Barreto, is the first Bishop of the Diocese and has served all his life for the Diocese. He comes from an aristocratic family from Velsao Goa which has been knighted by the King of Portugal during the Portuguese rule.

In 2015, a true witness of Bishop Alwyn, from London, stated that, Bishop Alwyn is 'A man of our time' 'Simple person' and He is widely known as a 'Smiling Bishop'.

Its stated that Bishop Alwyn has put every penny from his side to the Diocese of Sindhudurgh, the share that he had received from his ancestry has been put in the Diocese to purchase land for the benefit of building schools.

External links
GCatholic.org
Catholic-hierarchy.org
Vatican press release on the creation

Roman Catholic dioceses in India
Christianity in Maharashtra
Christian organizations established in 2005
Roman Catholic dioceses and prelatures established in the 21st century
2005 establishments in Maharashtra